Doctor Juan Manuel Frutos is a town in the Caaguazú department of Paraguay.

The town was formerly called "Pastoreo" and is still commonly known by this name.

Sources 
World Gazeteer: Paraguay – World-Gazetteer.com

Populated places in the Caaguazú Department